Abu Talha al-Sudani (also Abu Taha al-Sudan or Tariq Abdullah), born in Sudan, was a suspected member of Al Qaeda terrorist organization, an explosives expert and a close aide Osama bin Laden.

He is believed to have traveled to Southern Lebanon along with Saif al-Adel, Saif al-Islam al-Masri, Abu Ja`far al-Masri and Abu Salim al-Masri, where he trained alongside Hezbollah.

A Sudanese national married to a Somali woman, al-Sudani had lived in Somalia since 1993. He was more recently identified as a close associate of Gouled Hassan Dourad, leader of a Mogadishu-based network that worked in support of Al Qaeda. The Office of the Director of National Intelligence revealed that al-Sudani had been involved with a plot to target the U.S. military base in Djibouti (see CJTF-HOA).

Al-Sudani was also believed to be the financier of the 1998 United States embassy bombings.

In December 2006, al-Sudani was reported to have led a group of ICU fighters in Idale as part of the War in Somalia. A month later he was the target of a U.S. Air Force AC-130 airstrike that allegedly killed an undetermined number (up to 70) of civilian nomadic tribesmen (denied by a US official), but not al-Sudani.

Time, citing a Pentagon official, reported in late November 2007 that al-Sudani had been killed. On September 2, 2008, in a video taunting the United States, Saleh Ali Saleh Nabhan confirmed the death of Abu Talha al-Sudani.

References

External links
Abu Talha al Sudani Profile at GlobalSecurity.org
Counter-Terrorism in Somalia: Losing Hearts and Minds? Crisis Group

Assassinated al-Qaeda members
Somalian al-Qaeda members
Al-Sudani, Abu Talha
Sudanese Islamists
Year of birth missing
2007 deaths